WZON (620 kHz) is an AM radio station broadcasting an oldies format, with one afternoon talk show.  The station is licensed to Bangor and serves Central Maine.

Along with sister stations 100.3 WKIT and 103.1 WZLO, WZON is owned by The Zone Corporation, the broadcast company owned by authors Tabitha King and her husband, best-selling horror writer Stephen King.  WZON operates at 5,000 watts, using a non-directional transmitter by day and a directional pattern at night to protect other stations on 620 kHz.  It is one of Maine's oldest radio stations, first signing on the air in 1926. WZON's competitor is cross-town rival WGUY in Veazie.

Programming
WZON primarily broadcasts an oldies format, but airs a local afternoon talk show. Local newscasts from Bangor CBS affiliate WABI-TV 5 are carried in the early morning and in the early evening. Hourly national news is supplied by CBS Radio News.

History
WZON is one of the oldest radio stations in Maine.  The station signed on in December 1926 as WLBZ, owned by Thompson L. Guernsey and operating from Dover-Foxcroft at 1440 kHz.  It moved to 620 in 1928; the following year, the station moved to Bangor and was transferred to Maine Broadcasting Company, which was controlled by Guernsey.  WLBZ was a CBS affiliate by 1930; in 1939, it switched to NBC.  Guernsey first attempted to sell the station to the Rines family, owner of WCSH in Portland, in 1938; however, Guernsey did not complete the deal, leading the Federal Communications Commission (FCC) to dismiss the application on June 18, 1940.  However, in 1944, to help pay off an outstanding note, Guernsey was forced to sell WLBZ at auction to the Rines-controlled Eastland Broadcasting Company.

By 1973, WLBZ had a middle-of-the-road music format; three years later, the station adopted an all-news format via NBC's News and Information Service (NIS). After NBC closed NIS a year later, WLBZ returned to its previous format for a time before flipping to top 40 as "Z62" in 1978.

The Rines' broadcasting company, the Maine Broadcasting System, decided to sell their radio stations in the early 1980s to focus on their television properties (including WLBZ-TV, which the Rines had acquired in 1958); as a result, in 1981, WLBZ was sold to Acton Communications and became WACZ.  Two years later, Stephen King purchased the station and implemented a rock format under the current WZON call letters.  Though WZON attracted a loyal audience, it was financially unsuccessful, leading the station to begin operating on a noncommercial basis in 1988.  Under this model, WZON began to ask for contributions from its listeners — similar to public radio stations.

King sold the station to Dr. John Tozer in 1990.  Tozer returned WZON to commercial operation with a talk format (and was the first station in Bangor to carry Rush Limbaugh); however, it remained unprofitable, and after two years he sold the station to NEB Communications.  Even after the sale, WZON's financial problems continued, with employees' paychecks bouncing and NEB falling behind on payments to both Tozer and King (who still owned the station's studios), and within months the station was forced into bankruptcy.  In 1993, a bankruptcy court judge approved a sale of the station back to King, who began to shift WZON to an all-sports format that August; the last non-sports shows, including Limbaugh and Larry King, were dropped in January 1994.

Even after the various changes at the station, WZON maintained its NBC Radio affiliation until 1999, when it was dropped after over 60 years in favor of ABC News Radio.

WZON changed its format to progressive talk, simulcast with 103.1 WZON-FM, on November 1, 2010; this returned the station to political talk programming.  The station retained its local sports broadcasts including Boston Celtics basketball. The morning show hosts were also retained, hosting an afternoon show on the AM side only, but were let go in May 2012 due to the station "losing too much money". Initially, the station carried CNN Radio newscasts; after CNN stopped providing radio newscasts on March 31, 2012, WZON switched to NBC News Radio, returning NBC-branded newscasts to the station for the first time in 13 years. WZON-FM dropped the progressive talk format in November 2012 (becoming WZLO), with the format continuing on the AM station. Outside of drive time, WZON's progressive talk format largely relied on nationally syndicated programs, including Thom Hartmann, Bill Press, Leslie Marshall, Marilu Henner, Clark Howard and Overnight America with Jon Grayson. After NBC News Radio shut down, WZON returned to its roots as an affiliate of the CBS Radio Network.

WZON dropped the progressive talk format in February 2018 and returned to the "Z62" branding with an oldies format; the station retained its afternoon talk show and simulcasts of WABI-TV newscasts. Prior to the format change, the station had been running "Z62 Throwback Weekends", offering a similar mix of music to the full-time oldies format.

Play-by-play coverage
In the past, WZON broadcast many high school sporting events, American Legion baseball games, Husson University athletic events, Boston Celtics basketball, Boston Red Sox baseball, as well as some Westwood One programming and other local events (such as the Kenduskeag Stream Canoe Race). Since the launch of WEZQ as a sports station in 2013, Celtics basketball, Husson University sports and Westwood One programming has moved to that station. In 2018, WEZQ acquired the rights to the Red Sox; following this move, Stephen King told the Bangor Daily News that "We had the rug pulled out from under us," and said that WZON was "never included in any negotiations with the Red Sox." WZON also has reduced its local sports broadcasts since the launch of WEZQ.

WZON was the long-time home of University of Maine sports until the summer of 2007, when the broadcasting rights were reassigned by the University of Maine and its media contractor Learfield Sports to WVOM and WGUY.

Contests
WZON often runs contests for local listeners, usually giving away tickets to upcoming professional sports events.  Prizes often include Boston Red Sox playoff tickets, Boston Celtics playoff tickets, NASCAR event tickets, and more.  In addition to these major contests, the local WZON shows include regular trivia segments with less valuable prizes, including pizzas and T-shirts.

Community involvement
WZON participates in the Jimmy Fund radio telethon and auction each summer.  The station gathers local and national sports memorabilia and auctions it off to the highest bidder.  Listeners have contributed thousands of dollars to the Jimmy Fund through this fund-raising mechanism over the years.

The station also brought Red Sox broadcasters and ESPN personalities to Bangor for special forums.

References

External links

ZON
Oldies radio stations in the United States
Radio stations established in 1926
1926 establishments in Maine
Stephen King